The Ministry of Supply was a department of the Government of Spain formed in 1918 responsible for ensuring the supply and distribution of food and other goods relevant for the economic survival of the country. It also assumed other powers related to strengthening the expansion of the Spanish economy after the Great War.

The Ministry of Supply assumed the powers of the General Commissariat of Supply, a government agency created in 1917 due to the crisis that Spain suffered in that year. The Ministry was abolished in May 1920 and its responsibilities passed to the newly created General Commissariat of Subsistence of the Ministry of Public Works.

History

Context 
When the I World War started on 28 July 1914, Spain was an economically backward country (with only the Basque Country and Catalonia with an important industry), a country that after the 1898 Spanish-American War and the 1899 treaty with Germany had ended its former colonial empire (Cuba, the Philippines and Puerto Rico). The country was morally shattered, with the government system of the "turno" in question, with an Army that was outdated, almost without a Navy, and with an active conflict with Morocco that led to crisis and strikes like Tragic Week in 1909. In addition, Spain did not belong to either of the two European alliances faced in the war. In 1913, Spain established a protectorate in the north of Morocco, which became a source of continuous military problems and it was not possible to pacify until 1927.

The conservative government of Eduardo Dato decided to keep Spain neutral, shared by the majority of the ruling class, and as Manuel Azaña claimed, the decision "was a forced neutrality, imposed by our own defenselessness". Neutrality had important economic and social consequences as there was a huge boost in the process of "modernization" that had started timidly in 1900, due to the considerable increase in Spanish industrial production that suddenly opened new markets (the ones of the belligerent countries). However, inflation skyrocketed as wages grew at a slower pace and there were shortages of necessities, such as bread, which led to riots of livelihoods in several cities and labor conflicts also grow led by the two major unions, the CNT and the UGT, which demanded salary increases that, at the end, would slow the decline in real wages due to inflation.

First measures 
The government's concern about possible social conflicts, which could be triggered by supply and inflation difficulties, led the Dato government to create the Supreme Subsistence Board in 1916 under the Subsistence Act of 1915 to guarantee supplies throughout the National territory. Its performance was so useless that in May of the following year it was dissolved. However, reality prevented disregarding the problem and a more efficient solution was sought, creating the General Commissariat for Supply.

This institution was directed by a single person, a Commissioner, at whose service were officials of the ministries of Finance, Development and Home Affairs. Its functions were, according to the Royal Decree of creation; to monitor the proper functioning of the internal supply; the purchase, if necessary, of foreign wheat, raise budgets to the Ministry of Development on necessary transport and to the Ministry of Finance regarding exports and imports. The Commissariat' acts were endorsed by the President of the Council of Ministers. The dependence of several ministries, as well as the endorsement of the President of the Council of Ministers limited the work of the Commissariat, so prime minister Antonio Maura decided to elevate the commissariat to ministerial rank being its first holder Juan Ventosa, until then commissioner.

Ministry 
The Ministry was created on September 6, 1918 from the existing Supply Commissariat. The Ministry survived the end of World War I, but a large part of its powers were previously assumed by the newly created Ministry of Labour, which eventually led to the abolish of the Ministry of Supply, and its replacement by the General Commissariat of Subsistence of the Ministry of Development.

List of Ministers

See also
 European War Office
 Spain during World War I

References

Defunct departments of the Spanish Government
Ministries established in 1918
1918 establishments in Spain